Vertical mixing may refer to:
an upward movement of air that occurs based on the movement of air masses in the Planetary boundary layer
a process of mixing fresh and salt water in estuaries

See also
Convective mixing